The Cathedral Basilica of Saint Joseph is the main Roman Catholic church building of San José de Mayo, Uruguay. It is the see of the Roman Catholic Diocese of San José de Mayo since 1955.

The construction started in 1857, with design of the Catalan master Antonio Fongivell. It was consecrated in 1874, dedicated to saint Joseph. In 1957 it was declared basilica minor and, that same year, National Sanctuary of Saint Joseph.

See also
 List of Roman Catholic cathedrals in Uruguay
 Roman Catholic Diocese of San José de Mayo

References

External links

 Diocese of San José de Mayo 

Roman Catholic church buildings in San José Department
San Jose
Roman Catholic churches completed in 1874
1874 establishments in Uruguay
Basilica churches in Uruguay
19th-century Roman Catholic church buildings in Uruguay